These are the results for the 44th edition of the Ronde van Nederland cycling race, which was held from August 24 to August 28, 2004. The race started in Oudenbosch and finished in Sittard-Geleen. It was won by Holland's Erik Dekker. It was the last edition of the event, which was renamed Eneco Tour for the UCI ProTour.

Stages

24-08-2004: Oudenbosch-Hoorn, 205 km

25-08-2004: Bolsward-Nijverdal, 182.5 km

26-08-2004: Kleve-Goch, 86.2 km

26-08-2004: Goch-Goch, 22.2 km

27-08-2004: Düsseldorf (Ger)-Sittard/Geleen, 221.9 km

28-08-2004: Sittard/Geleen-Landgraaf, 197.7 km

Final classification

External links
Wielersite Results

Ronde van Nederland
2004 in road cycling
Ronde